The women's mass start event of the Biathlon World Championships 2013 was held on February 17, 2013. 30 athletes participated over a course of 12.5 km.

Results
The race started at 12:00.

References

Women's mass start
2013 in Czech women's sport